California's 35th district may refer to:

 California's 35th congressional district
 California's 35th State Assembly district
 California's 35th State Senate district